Erkki Keldo (born on 7 November 1990 in Jõgeva) is an Estonian politician. He has been member of XIV Riigikogu.

In 2013 he graduated from Tallinn University in government and administration speciality. In 2014 he graduated from Tallinn University of Technology in economics speciality.

Since 2018 he is Secretary General of Estonian Reform Party.

Since 2012 he is a member of Estonian Reform Party.

References

1990 births
Estonian Reform Party politicians
Living people
Members of the Riigikogu, 2019–2023
Members of the Riigikogu, 2023–2027
People from Jõgeva
Tallinn University alumni
Tallinn University of Technology alumni